Apache Grove is a populated place situated in Greenlee County, Arizona, United States. The Apache Creek runs through the town and there is a small bar and convenience store north of the creek.

References

Populated places in Greenlee County, Arizona